John Brendan McCormack (August 12, 1935 – September 21, 2021) was an American prelate of the Roman Catholic Church. He served as the ninth bishop of the Diocese of Manchester from 1998 until 2011.

Biography

Early life and education
John McCormack was born in Winthrop, Massachusetts, to Cornelius and Eleanor (née Noonan) McCormack. Raised in Cambridge, he attended Boston College High School and St. John's Seminary.

Ordination and ministry
McCormack was ordained to the priesthood by Cardinal Richard Cushing on February 2, 1960, and then served as an associate pastor at St. James Parish in Salem.

He was the executive director of North Shore Catholic Charities Center in Peabody from 1967 to 1981. During this time, he also pursued his graduate studies at Boston College, from where he obtained a Master's degree in social work in 1969. In 1981 he was appointed pastor of Immaculate Conception Parish in Malden.

In 1984 he became Secretary for Ministerial Personnel in the Archdiocese of Boston. In this position, McCormack was Cardinal Bernard Francis Law's point person on hearing complaints against priests accused of sexual misconduct and removing some of them from active duty.
He was made pastor of St. Francis Xavier Parish in Weymouth in 1994.

Auxiliary Bishop of Boston, Massachusetts
On November 21, 1995, McCormack was appointed Auxiliary Bishop of Boston and Titular Bishop of Cerbali by Pope John Paul II. He received his episcopal consecration on the following December 27 from Cardinal Law, with Cardinal William Wakefield Baum and Bishop Alfred Clifton Hughes serving as co-consecrators. He chose for his episcopal motto: "Christ in all things."

As an auxiliary, he served as regional bishop for the South Region of the Archdiocese.

Bishop of Manchester, New Hampshire
McCormack was later named the ninth Bishop of Manchester, New Hampshire, on July 21, 1998, succeeding the late Leo O'Neil. He was formally installed on September 22, 1998.

In early 2002, McCormack publicly announced the names of 14 priests in the diocese who had been accused of sexually abusing children (cf Sexual abuse scandal in Manchester diocese). In 2003, the diocese reached a settlement with the New Hampshire Attorney General's Office, which was investigating the child sex abuse scandal. The settlement spared the diocese from being criminally charged. In all, in the period of 2002-03, the diocese agreed to a $15.5 million settlement involving 176 claims of sex abuse.

The May 2003 settlement of 61 abuse claims for $6.5 million handled by Manchester attorney Ovide M. Lamontagne as counsel for the Manchester Diocese prevented the diocese from being criminally prosecuted. In December 2002, the diocese had admitted that its failure to protect children from sexual abuse may have been a violation of criminal law, becoming the first diocese in the United States to do so. Under threat of indictment by the New Hampshire Attorney General, McCormack signed an agreement acknowledging that the Attorney General office possessed evidence sufficient to win convictions as part of the settlement.

Lamontagne claimed that McCormack and other prominent church members wanted a speedy settlement and, in an example of behaving "pastorally" rather than as a litigant, instructed their attorneys to take a moderate stance and eschew hardline legal tactics. Lamontagne said of the diocese's legal strategy, "That is not typical in terms of client requests."

Retirement and death
On August 10, 2010, in accordance with canon 401 §1 of the 1983 Code of Canon Law, Bishop McCormack submitted his resignation to Pope Benedict XVI as bishop of the Diocese of Manchester. His resignation was accepted on Monday, September 19, 2011, when Pope Benedict XVI appointed then-Auxiliary Bishop Peter Anthony Libasci of the Roman Catholic Diocese of Rockville Centre, New York, as his successor.

McCormack died in Manchester, New Hampshire on September 21, 2021, at the age of 86.

See also
 

 Catholic Church hierarchy
 Catholic Church in the United States
 Historical list of the Catholic bishops of the United States
 List of Catholic bishops of the United States
 Lists of patriarchs, archbishops, and bishops

References

Works cited

External links 
Profile at The Diocese of Manchester website
New York Times: Boston Church Papers Released
Nashua (NH) Telegraph: Catholic Church abuse policies need work
PBS Frontline "Hand of God"
Profile at Catholic Hierarchy
Roman Catholic Archdiocese of Boston
Roman Catholic Diocese of Manchester

Episcopal succession

1935 births
2021 deaths
People from Winthrop, Massachusetts
Saint John's Seminary (Massachusetts) alumni
Boston College Graduate School of Social Work alumni
Roman Catholic Archdiocese of Boston
Roman Catholic bishops of Manchester
20th-century Roman Catholic bishops in the United States
21st-century Roman Catholic bishops in the United States
Religious leaders from Massachusetts
Boston College High School alumni
Catholics from Massachusetts